

Administrative and municipal divisions

References

Khanty-Mansi Autonomous Okrug
Khanty-Mansi Autonomous Okrug